MV Hamnavoe is a car and passenger ferry, built in 2002 and operated by NorthLink Ferries across the Pentland Firth from the mainland of Scotland to the Orkney Islands.

Description
Hamnavoe has a capacity for 600 passengers and 68 cars. Facilities include passenger lounges and bars, a self-service restaurant, a children's playroom, a sun deck and a games room. There are 16 passenger cabins with two or four berths, which are all en suite. There are two specially adapted cabins for the disabled and wheelchair access throughout the ship.

History
Hamnavoe is the first ferry to have been specifically built for the Pentland Firth route, and was given the old Norse name for Stromness, meaning 'Home Port' or 'Safe Haven'. The ship was originally ordered in October 2000 from Ferguson Shipbuilders at Port Glasgow but Fergusons withdrew from the contract only two months later due to design arrangements and production scheduling. The construction was re-allocated to Aker Finnyards at Rauma, Finland which had already been awarded contracts for two larger ferries for NorthLink.

However, due to delays in the building of the new pier in Scrabster, Hamnavoe was laid up in Leith. Since 2003 the formal ownership of Hamnavoe has changed in line with changes in the operator of NorthLink. Since 2018 the ferry has been registered to Caledonian Marine Assets Limited, and operated by Serco.

Service
Hamnavoe was introduced on the Pentland Firth lifeline ferry service between Scrabster in Caithness and Stromness in Orkney in 2003. The voyage takes approximately 90 minutes and is made up to six times a day. Overnight accommodation is available on board in Stromness for passengers travelling on the 6:30 a.m. sailing.

The route gives a superb view of the spectacular sea stack the Old Man of Hoy, and the tallest vertical cliff face in Britain, St Johns Head.
 
New piers and walkways have been built at Scrabster and Stromness specifically for Hamnavoe, and fitted with lifts to accommodate disabled passengers.

Volcanic ash cloud
In April 2010 as the volcanic ash cloud from Iceland closed much of Europe's airspace, Hamnavoe was taken off her normal route for three days and sent to Bergen in Norway to rescue stranded British residents. More than 150 passengers took the 18-hour trip from Bergen to Aberdeen. On returning to her usual route, Hamnavoe made an unscheduled trip from Aberdeen to Stromness in Orkney carrying passengers.

Footnotes

External links

 NorthLink Ferries - Official Website
 Ships of Calmac

NorthLink Ferries
2002 ships
Ships built in Rauma, Finland